Oyamada (written: 小山田 lit. "hill field") is a Japanese surname. Notable people with the surname include:

, Japanese writer
, Japanese samurai
, Japanese actress
Oyamada Clan, Japanese clan

See also
, train station in Hanamaki, Iwate Prefecture, Japan
 former village in Ayama District, Mie Prefecture, Japan
, Japanese surname using the same kanji

Japanese-language surnames